Ray Murphy is former American football coach.  He served as the head football coach at Kean University in Union, New Jersey for three seasons, from 1977 to 1979, compiling a record of 10–18–2.

Head coaching record

References

Year of birth missing
Possibly living people
Bridgeport Purple Knights football coaches
Kean Cougars football coaches